Bottoms Reservoir may refer to:

Bottoms Reservoir (Derbyshire), England
Bottoms Reservoir (Cheshire), England